Stephen John Sackur (born 9 January 1964) is an English journalist who presents HARDtalk, a current affairs interview programme on BBC World News and the BBC News Channel. He was also the main Friday presenter of GMT on BBC World News. For fifteen years, he was a BBC foreign correspondent.

Early life and education
Sackur was born in Spilsby, Lincolnshire, England, where he grew up. His father Robert Sackur, a farmer, was the Labour Party candidate for the Lincolnshire constituencies of Horncastle and Holland with Boston in the 1966 and 1970 general elections respectively. Sackur was educated at King Edward VI Grammar School, Spilsby, and Emmanuel College, Cambridge, where he gained a BA honours degree in history, and then joined Harvard University's John F. Kennedy School of Government as a Henry Fellow.

Career
Sackur began working at the BBC as a trainee in 1986, and in 1990 he was appointed as one of its foreign affairs correspondents. As a BBC Radio correspondent, Sackur reported on the Velvet Revolution of Czechoslovakia in 1989 and the reunification of Germany in 1990. During the Gulf War, he was part of a BBC team covering the conflict and spent eight weeks as an embedded journalist with the British Army. At the end of the war, he was the first correspondent to report the massacre of the retreating Iraqi army on the road leading out of Kuwait.

Sackur was based in Cairo, Egypt, between 1992 and 1995 as the BBC's correspondent in the Middle East and he later moved to Jerusalem in 1995 until 1997. He covered both the assassination of Israeli Prime Minister Yitzhak Rabin and the growth of the Palestinian Authority under Yasser Arafat.

Between 1997 and 2002, he was appointed the BBC's correspondent in Washington and covered the Lewinsky scandal. He later covered the U.S. presidential election in 2000 and interviewed President George W. Bush.

HARDtalk
In 2005, Sackur replaced Tim Sebastian as the regular host of the BBC's news programme HARDtalk. He has since interviewed President Hugo Chávez of Venezuela, President Teodoro Obiang of Equatorial Guinea, President Thein Sein of Burma and others. He has also interviewed cultural figures including Gore Vidal, Annie Lennox, Charlize Theron, Vladimir Ashkenazy and William Shatner.

Sackur was named "International TV Personality of the Year" by the Association for International Broadcasting (AIB) in November 2010.

He was nominated as "Speech Broadcaster of the Year" at the Sony Radio Awards 2013.

In July 2018, Sackur was awarded an Honorary Doctorate by the University of Warwick.

Criticism
The Lemkin Institute for Genocide Prevention criticized Sackur for suggesting genocide as one of two "realistic options" for the Armenians of Nagorno-Karabakh during a HARDtalk interview with Ruben Vardanyan. Sackur had suggested the Armenians of the Republic of Artsakh either accept "a political deal or leave" due to the 2022–2023 blockade of the Republic of Artsakh. According to Lemkin Institute, Sackur had blamed the victims for the blockade: "Artsakh is under blockade not because of the genocidal designs of Azerbaijan, but because of some inexplicable stubbornness on the part of Armenians in Artsakh or their leaders – or both, as he seems to believe". The Lemkin Institute further criticized Sackur for trying to suggest the word Artsakh (the historical Armenian name for Nagorno-Karabakh) was illegitimate and for ignoring the rights of self-determination.

References

External links

HARDtalk official site

1964 births
Living people
Alumni of Emmanuel College, Cambridge
Harvard Kennedy School alumni
British television presenters
BBC World News
BBC World Service presenters
BBC newsreaders and journalists
British reporters and correspondents
People from Spilsby